Communicate is the fifth mix album by British DJ duo Sasha & John Digweed. It is the first since 1994 to not be part of the Northern Exposure concept album series.

Critical reception

Communicate was met with "mixed or average" reviews from critics. At Metacritic, which assigns a weighted average rating out of 100 to reviews from mainstream publications, this release received an average score of 53 based on 7 reviews.

In a review for AllMusic, Jason Birchmeier wrote: "Communicate can be seen as the duo's best mix CD to date with its striking consistency at all levels, ranging from track selection to mixing to mood to tempo. Rather than moving through a broad palette of sounds, moods, tempos, and styles, the two British DJs choose to remain consistent. At Exclaim!, Venk Chanran wrote: "Communicate may not be as challenging and as boundary pushing as the earlier albums, but it still pleases the ear. The second disc is a lot harder, pushing rhythms and layering melodies over each other with technical precision.

Track listing

 The US version features the track Sven Väth - "Barbarella (Deep Dish Mix)" in place of track 3

References

External links

DJ mix albums
Sasha (DJ) albums
2000 remix albums
2000 compilation albums